Eosinophil major basic protein, often shortened to major basic protein (MBP; also called Proteoglycan 2 (PRG2)) is encoded in humans by the PRG2 gene.

Function 

The protein encoded by this gene is the predominant constituent of the crystalline core of the eosinophil granule. High levels of the proform of this protein are also present in placenta and pregnancy serum, where it exists as a complex with several other proteins including pregnancy-associated plasma protein A (PAPPA), angiotensinogen (AGT), and C3dg. This protein may be involved in antiparasitic defense mechanisms as a cytotoxin and helmintho-toxin, and in immune hypersensitivity reactions. It is directly implicated in epithelial cell damage, exfoliation, and bronchospasm in allergic diseases.

PRG2 is a 117-residue protein that predominates in eosinophil granules.  It is a potent enzyme against helminths and is toxic towards bacteria and mammalian cells in vitro. The eosinophil major basic protein also causes the release of histamine from mast cells and basophils, and activates neutrophils and alveolar macrophages.

Structure 

Structurally the major basic protein (MBP) is similar to lectins (sugar-binding proteins), and has a fold similar to that seen in C-type lectins. However, unlike other C-type lectins (those that bind various carbohydrates in the presence of calcium), MBP does not bind either calcium or any of the other carbohydrates that this family recognize.

Instead, MBP recognises heparan sulfate proteoglycans. Two crystallographic structures of MBP have been determined.

Interactions
Major basic protein has been shown to interact with Pregnancy-associated plasma protein A.

See also
 Arylsulfatase

References

Further reading

External links
 
 

Human proteins